Ninahuilca is a volcano in the Western Cordillera of Ecuador. It is southwest of Atacazo.

References 

Volcanoes of Ecuador